Events from the year 1916 in Taiwan, Empire of Japan.

Incumbents

Central government of Japan
 Prime Minister: Ōkuma Shigenobu, Terauchi Masatake

Taiwan
 Governor-General – Andō Teibi

Events

August
 28 August – The largest in the Nantou earthquake sequence occurred

Births
 23 April – Wang King-ho, physician

References

 
Years of the 20th century in Taiwan